Paderna is a comune (municipality) in the Province of Alessandria in the Italian region Piedmont, located about  southeast of Turin and about  southeast of Alessandria.

Paderna borders the following municipalities: Carezzano, Costa Vescovato, Spineto Scrivia, Tortona, and Villaromagnano.

References

Cities and towns in Piedmont